This is a checklist of amphibians found in Northern America, based mainly on publications by the Society for the Study of Amphibians and Reptiles. The information about range and status of almost all of these species can be found also for example in the IUCN Red List of Threatened Species site. It includes all species of Bermuda, Canada, Greenland, Saint Pierre and Miquelon, and the United States* alien species
Summary of 2006 IUCN Red List categories.
Conservation status – IUCN Red List of Threatened Species:
 – extinct,  – extinct in the wild
 – critically endangered,  – endangered,  – vulnerable
 – near threatened,  – least concern
 – data deficient,  – not evaluated
(v. 2013.2, the data are current as of March 5, 2014)
and Endangered Species Act:
 – endangered,  – threatened
,  – experimental nonessential or essential population
,  – endangered or threatened due to similarity of appearance
(the data are current as of March 28, 2014)

Order: Urodela

Suborder: Cryptobranchoidea

Family: Cryptobranchidae
Hellbender, Cryptobranchus alleganiensis  (Ozark hellbender,)

Suborder: Salamandroidea

Family: Salamandridae

Subfamily: Pleurodelinae
Eastern newts
Black-spotted newt, Notophthalmus meridionalis 
Striped newt, Notophthalmus perstriatus 
Eastern newt, Notophthalmus viridescens 
Pacific newts
Rough-skinned newt, Taricha granulosa 
Red-bellied newt, Taricha rivularis 
Sierra newt, Taricha sierrae 
California newt, Taricha torosa

Family: Plethodontidae

Subfamily: Plethodontinae
Web-toed salamanders
Limestone salamander, Hydromantes brunus 
Mount Lyell salamander, Hydromantes platycephalus 
Samwel Shasta salamander, Hydromantes samweli
Shasta salamander, Hydromantes shastae 
Wintu Shasta salamander, Hydromantes wintu
Climbing salamanders
Green salamander, Aneides aeneus 
Hickory Nut Gorge green salamander, Aneides caryaensis
Clouded salamander, Aneides ferreus 
Speckled black salamander, Aneides flavipunctatus  and:
Santa Cruz black salamander, Aneides (flavipunctatus) niger
Shasta salamander, Aneides iecanus
Sacramento Mountains salamander, Aneides hardii 
Klamath black salamander, Aneides klamathensis
Arboreal salamander, Aneides lugubris 
Wandering salamander, Aneides vagrans 
Dusky salamanders
Seepage salamander, Desmognathus aeneus 
Holbrook's southern dusky salamander, Desmognathus auriculatus  and:
Carolina swamp dusky salamander, Desmognathus valtos
Valentine's southern dusky salamander, Desmognathus valentinei and:
Pascagoula dusky salamander, Desmognathus pascagoula
Ouachita dusky salamander, Desmognathus brimleyorum 
Northern dusky salamander, Desmognathus fuscus  and:
Spotted dusky salamander, Desmognathus conanti
Flat-headed salamander, Desmognathus planiceps
Imitator salamander, Desmognathus imitator 
Desmognathus marmoratus/Desmognathus 'quadramaculatus complex:
Shovel-nosed salamander, Desmognathus marmoratus  and:
Golden shovel-nosed salamander, Desmognathus aureatus
Black shovel-nosed salamander, Desmognathus melanius
Central shovel-nosed dusky salamander, Desmognathus intermedius
Species split from the former black-bellied salamander, Desmognathus quadramaculatus (complex of "black-bellied salamanders"):
Dwarf black-bellied salamander, Desmognathus folkertsi 
Nantahala black-bellied salamander, Desmognathus amphileucus
Cherokee blackbellied salamander, Desmognathus gvnigeusgwotli
Kanawha blackbellied salamander, Desmognathus kanawha
Pisgah black-bellied salamander, Desmognathus mavrokoilius
Seal salamander, Desmognathus monticola 
Desmognathus ochrophaeus complex:
Mountain dusky salamander, Desmognathus ochrophaeus  and: 
Cumberland dusky salamander, Desmognathus abditus 
Carolina mountain dusky salamander, Desmognathus carolinensis 
Ocoee salamander, Desmognathus ocoee  and: 
Cherokee mountain dusky salamander, Desmognathus adatsihi
Great Balsams mountain dusky salamander, Desmognathus balsameus
Tallulah salamander, Desmognathus perlapsus
Blue Ridge dusky salamander, Desmognathus orestes 
Apalachicola dusky salamander, Desmognathus apalachicolae 
Northern pygmy salamander, Desmognathus organi
Santeetlah dusky salamander, Desmognathus santeetlah 
Black mountain salamander, Desmognathus welteri 
Pygmy salamander, Desmognathus wrighti 
Ensatina
Ensatina, Ensatina eschscholtzii 
Red Hills salamander
Red Hills salamander, Phaeognathus hubrichti  
Woodland salamanders
Ainsworth's salamander or Bay Springs salamander, Plethodon ainsworthi 
Western slimy salamander, Plethodon albagula 
Blue Ridge gray-cheeked salamander, Plethodon amplus 
Ozark zigzag salamander, Plethodon angusticlavius 
Scott Bar salamander, Plethodon asupak 
Tellico salamander, Plethodon aureolus 
Caddo Mountain salamander, Plethodon caddoensis 
Chattahoochee slimy salamander, Plethodon chattahoochee
Cheoah Bald salamander, Plethodon cheoah 
Atlantic Coast slimy salamander, Plethodon chlorobryonis
Red-backed salamander or eastern red-backed salamander, Plethodon cinereus 
White-spotted slimy salamander, Plethodon cylindraceus 
Northern zigzag salamander, Plethodon dorsalis 
Dunn's salamander, Plethodon dunni 
Northern ravine salamander, Plethodon electromorphus 
Del Norte salamander, Plethodon elongatus 
Fourche Mountain salamander, Plethodon fourchensis 
Northern slimy salamander, Plethodon glutinosus  and:
Southeastern slimy salamander, Plethodon grobmani
Mississippi slimy salamander, Plethodon mississippi
Valley and ridge salamander, Plethodon hoffmani 
Peaks of Otter salamander, Plethodon hubrichti 
Coeur d'Alene salamander, Plethodon idahoensis 
Red-cheeked salamander, Plethodon jordani 
Cumberland Plateau salamander, Plethodon kentucki 
Kiamichi slimy salamander, Plethodon kiamichi 
Louisiana slimy salamander, Plethodon kisatchie 
Larch Mountain salamander, Plethodon larselli 
South Mountain graycheeked salamander, Plethodon meridianus 
Southern gray-cheeked salamander, Plethodon metcalfi 
Northern gray-cheeked salamander, Plethodon montanus 
Jemez Mountains salamander, Plethodon neomexicanus  
Cheat Mountain salamander, Plethodon nettingi  
Ocmulgee slimy salamander, Plethodon ocmulgee
Rich Mountain salamander, Plethodon ouachitae 
Pigeon Mountain salamander, Plethodon petraeus 
White-spotted salamander, Plethodon punctatus 
Ravine salamander or southern ravine salamander, Plethodon richmondi 
Savannah slimy salamander, Plethodon savannah
Sequoyah slimy salamander, Plethodon sequoyah 
Southern red-backed salamander, Plethodon serratus 
Shenandoah salamander, Plethodon shenandoah  
Big Levels salamander, Plethodon sherando 
Red-legged salamander, Plethodon shermani 
Siskiyou Mountains salamander, Plethodon stormi 
Southern Appalachian salamander, Plethodon teyahalee 
Van Dyke's salamander, Plethodon vandykei 
South Carolina slimy salamander, Plethodon variolatus
Western redback salamander, Plethodon vehiculum 
Southern zigzag salamander, Plethodon ventralis 
Shenandoah Mountain salamander, Plethodon virginia 
Webster's salamander, Plethodon websteri 
Wehrle's salamander, Plethodon wehrlei  and:
Dixie Cavern salamander, Plethodon dixi
Blacksburg salamander, Plethodon jacksoni
Yellow-spotted woodland salamander, Plethodon pauleyi
Weller's salamander, Plethodon welleri 
Yonahlossee salamander, Plethodon yonahlossee 
Patch-nosed salamander, Urspelerpes brucei

Subfamily: Spelerpinae
Brook salamanders
Two-lined salamander (Eurycea bislineata) complex:
Northern two-lined salamander, Eurycea bislineata 
Brown-backed salamander, Eurycea aquatica
Junaluska salamander, Eurycea junaluska 
Blue Ridge two-lined salamander, Eurycea wilderae 
Southern two-lined salamander, Eurycea cirrigera  and:
Carolina sandhills salamander, Eurycea arenicola 
Salado Springs salamander, Eurycea chisholmensis  
Three-lined salamander, Eurycea guttolineata 
Cascade Caverns salamander, Eurycea latitans  and:
Comal blind salamander, Eurycea tridentifera 
Long-tailed salamander, Eurycea longicauda 
Cave salamander, Eurycea lucifuga 
Eurycea multiplicata complex:
Many-ribbed salamander, Eurycea multiplicata 
Grotto salamander, Eurycea spelaea  and:
Southern grotto salamander, Eurycea braggi
Northern grotto salamander, Eurycea nerea
Ouachita streambed salamander, Eurycea subfluvicola
Oklahoma salamander, Eurycea tynerensis 
San Marcos salamander, Eurycea nana  
Georgetown salamander, Eurycea naufragia  
Texas salamander, Eurycea neotenes 
Blanco River Springs salamander, Eurycea pterophila 
Eurycea quadridigitata complex:
Southeastern dwarf salamander, Eurycea quadridigitata 
Chamberlain's dwarf salamander, Eurycea chamberlaini 
Hillis's dwarf salamander, Eurycea hillisi
Western dwarf salamander, Eurycea paludicola
Bog dwarf salamander, Eurycea sphagnicola
Barton Springs salamander, Eurycea sosorum  
Jollyville Plateau salamander, Eurycea tonkawae  
Valdina Farms salamander, Eurycea troglodytes 
Austin blind salamander, Eurycea waterlooensis  
Texas blind salamander, Eurycea rathbuni  
Blanco blind salamander, Eurycea robusta 
Georgia blind salamander, Eurycea wallacei 
Spring salamanders
Berry Cave salamander, Gyrinophilus gulolineatus 
Tennessee cave salamander, Gyrinophilus palleucus 
Spring salamander, Gyrinophilus porphyriticus 
West Virginia spring salamander, Gyrinophilus subterraneus 
Red and mud salamanders
Mud salamander, Pseudotriton montanus  and:
Midland mud salamander, Pseudotriton (montanus) diastictus
Red salamander, Pseudotriton ruber 
Many-lined salamander
Many-lined salamander, Stereochilus marginatus

Subfamily: Bolitoglossinae
Slender salamanders
Subgenus: Batrachoseps
California slender salamander, Batrachoseps attenuatus 
San Gabriel slender salamander, Batrachoseps gabrieli 
Batrachoseps diabolicus group:
Hell Hollow slender salamander, Batrachoseps diabolicus 
Greenhorn Mountains slender salamander, Batrachoseps altasierrae
Sequoia slender salamander, Batrachoseps kawia 
Kings River slender salamander, Batrachoseps regius 
Batrachoseps nigriventris group:
Black-bellied slender salamander, Batrachoseps nigriventris 
Fairview slender salamander, Batrachoseps bramei
Gregarious slender salamander, Batrachoseps gregarius 
Relictual slender salamander, Batrachoseps relictus 
Kern Canyon slender salamander, Batrachoseps simatus 
Tehachapi slender salamander, Batrachoseps stebbinsi 
Batrachoseps pacificus group:
Channel Islands slender salamander, Batrachoseps pacificus 
Arguello slender salamander, Batrachoseps wakei
Southern California slender salamander, Batrachoseps major  (desert slender salamander B. (m.) aridus)
Lesser slender salamander, Batrachoseps minor 
Gabilan Mountains slender salamander, Batrachoseps gavilanensis 
San Simeon slender salamander, Batrachoseps incognitus 
Santa Lucia Mountains slender salamander, Batrachoseps luciae 
Subgenus: Plethopsis
Inyo Mountains salamander, Batrachoseps campi 
Kern Plateau salamander, Batrachoseps robustus 
Oregon slender salamander, Batrachoseps wrighti

Subfamily: Hemidactyliinae
Fourtoed salamander, Hemidactylium scutatum

Family: Proteidae
Dwarf waterdog, Necturus punctatus 
Alabama waterdog, Necturus alabamensis  and:
Mobile waterdog, Necturus lodingi  (sometimes recognized,
Gulf Coast waterdog, Necturus beyeri 
Neuse River waterdog, Necturus lewisi 
Common mudpuppy, Necturus maculosus  and:
Red River mudpuppy, Necturus (maculosus) louisianensis 
Apalachicola waterdog, Necturus moleri
Escambia waterdog, Necturus mounti

Family: Ambystomatidae

Ringed salamander, Ambystoma annulatum 
Streamside salamander, Ambystoma barbouri 
Frosted flatwoods salamander, Ambystoma cingulatum   and:
Reticulated flatwoods salamander, Ambystoma bishopi  
California tiger salamander, Ambystoma californiense  (Santa Barbara and Sonoma Counties , central California )
Northwestern salamander, Ambystoma gracile 
Jefferson salamander, Ambystoma jeffersonianum 
Blue-spotted salamander, Ambystoma laterale 
Mabee's salamander, Ambystoma mabeei 
Long-toed salamander, Ambystoma macrodactylum  (Santa Cruz long-toed salamander,)
Spotted salamander, Ambystoma maculatum 
Western tiger salamander, Ambystoma mavortium (Sonoran tiger salamander,)
Marbled salamander, Ambystoma opacum 
Mole salamander, Ambystoma talpoideum 
Small-mouthed salamander, Ambystoma texanum 
Eastern tiger salamander, Ambystoma tigrinum

Family: Amphiumidae
Two-toed amphiuma, Amphiuma means 
One-toed amphiuma, Amphiuma pholeter 
Three-toed amphiuma, Amphiuma tridactylum

Family: Dicamptodontidae
Idaho giant salamander, Dicamptodon aterrimus 
Cope's giant salamander, Dicamptodon copei 
California giant salamander, Dicamptodon ensatus 
Coastal giant salamander, Dicamptodon tenebrosus

Family: Rhyacotritonidae

Cascade torrent salamander, Rhyacotriton cascadae 
Columbia torrent salamander, Rhyacotriton kezeri 
Olympic torrent salamander, Rhyacotriton olympicus 
Southern torrent salamander, Rhyacotriton variegatus

Suborder: Sirenoidea

Family: Sirenidae
Dwarf sirens
Southern dwarf siren, Pseudobranchus axanthus 
Northern dwarf siren, Pseudobranchus striatus 
Sirens
Lesser siren, Siren intermedia 
Greater siren, Siren lacertina 
Reticulated siren, Siren reticulata

Order: Anura

Suborder: Archaeobatrachia

Family: Ascaphidae
Rocky Mountain tailed frog, Ascaphus montanus 
Coastal tailed frog, Ascaphus truei

Suborder: Mesobatrachia

Family: Pipidae
African clawed frog, Xenopus laevis * 
Western clawed frog, Xenopus tropicalis *

Family: Rhinophrynidae
Burrowing toad, Rhinophrynus dorsalis

Family: Scaphiopodidae
North American spadefoot toads
Couch's spadefoot, Scaphiopus couchii 
Eastern spadefoot, Scaphiopus holbrookii 
Hurter's spadefoot, Scaphiopus hurterii 
Western spadefoot toads
Plains spadefoot, Spea bombifrons 
Western spadefoot, Spea hammondii 
Great Basin spadefoot, Spea intermontana 
Mexican spadefoot, Spea multiplicata

Suborder: Neobatrachia

Family: Bufonidae
American toad, Anaxyrus americanus 
Wyoming toad, Anaxyrus baxteri 
Western toad, Anaxyrus boreas  and:
Amargosa toad, Anaxyrus nelsoni 
Arroyo toad, Anaxyrus californicus  
Yosemite toad, Anaxyrus canorus 
Great Plains toad, Anaxyrus cognatus 
Chihuahuan green toad, Anaxyrus debilis 
Black toad, Anaxyrus exsul 
Fowler's toad, Anaxyrus fowleri 
Canadian toad, Anaxyrus hemiophrys  
Houston toad, Anaxyrus houstonensis  
Arizona toad, Anaxyrus microscaphus 
Hot Creek toad, Anaxyrus monfontanus
Railroad Valley toad, Anaxyrus nevadensis
Red-spotted toad, Anaxyrus punctatus 
Oak toad, Anaxyrus quercicus 
Sonoran green toad, Anaxyrus retiformis 
Texas toad, Anaxyrus speciosus 
Southern toad, Anaxyrus terrestris 
Woodhouse's toad, Anaxyrus woodhousii 
Dixie Valley toad, Anaxyrus williamsi
Colorado River toad, Incilius alvarius 
Coastal plains toad, Incilius nebulifer  (formerly in Incilius valliceps)
South American cane toad, Rhinella marina  and:
Mesoamerican Cane toad, Rhinella horribilis

Family: Hylidae

Subfamily: Hylinae
Tree frogs
Pine Barrens tree frog, Hyla andersonii (Dryophytes andersonii) 
Canyon tree frog, Hyla arenicolor (Dryophytes arenicolor) 
Bird-voiced tree frog, Hyla avivoca (Dryophytes avivoca) 
Cope's gray treefrog, Hyla chrysoscelis (Dryophytes chrysoscelis) 
American green tree frog, Hyla cinerea (Dryophytes cinereus) 
Pine woods tree frog, Hyla femoralis (Dryophytes femoralis) 
Barking tree frog, Hyla gratiosa (Dryophytes gratiosus) 
Squirrel tree frog, Hyla squirella (Dryophytes squirellus) 
Gray tree frog, Hyla versicolor (Dryophytes versicolor) 
Arizona tree frog, Hyla wrightorum (Dryophytes wrightorum)  (formerly in Hyla eximia)
Chorus frogs
Mountain chorus frog, Pseudacris brachyphona  and:
Collinses’ mountain chorus frog, Pseudacris collinsorum
Brimley's chorus frog, Pseudacris brimleyi 
California tree frog, Pseudacris cadaverina 
Spotted chorus frog, Pseudacris clarkii 
Spring peeper, Pseudacris crucifer 
Western chorus frog, Pseudacris triseriata  and:
Upland chorus frog, Pseudacris feriarum  and:
Cajun chorus frog, Pseudacris fouquettei 
New Jersey chorus frog, Pseudacris kalmi 
Pacific tree frog, Pseudacris regilla  and:
Baja California tree frog, Pseudacris hypochondriaca
Sierran tree frog, Pseudacris sierra
Illinois chorus frog, Pseudacris illinoensis or Pseudacris streckeri illinoensis
Boreal chorus frog, Pseudacris maculata 
Southern chorus frog, Pseudacris nigrita 
Little grass frog, Pseudacris ocularis 
Ornate chorus frog, Pseudacris ornata 
Strecker's chorus frog, Pseudacris streckeri 
Cricket frogs
Cricket frog, Acris crepitans  and:
Blanchard's cricket frog, Acris (crepitans) blanchardi
Southern cricket frog, Acris gryllus 
Other tree frogs
Cuban tree frog, Osteopilus septentrionalis * 
Mexican tree frog, Smilisca baudinii 
Lowland burrowing tree frog, Smilisca fodiens

Family: Pelodryadidae
(Australian treefrogs)
Australian green tree frog, Ranoidea caerulea *

Family: Ranidae
Typical frogs
Northern red-legged frog, Rana aurora  and:
California red-legged frog, Rana draytonii  
Foothill yellow-legged frog, Rana boylii 
Cascades frog, Rana cascadae 
Columbia spotted frog, Rana luteiventris 
Southern mountain yellow-legged frog, Rana muscosa   and:
Sierra Nevada yellow-legged frog, Rana sierrae 
Oregon spotted frog, Rana pretiosa 
Water frogs
American bullfrog, Lithobates catesbeianus 
Gopher frog, Lithobates capito 
Crawfish frog, Lithobates areolatus 
Mississippi gopher frog or dusky gopher frog, Lithobates sevosus  
Rio Grande leopard frog, Lithobates berlandieri 
Plains leopard frog, Lithobates blairi 
Chiricahua leopard frog, Lithobates chiricahuensis   and:
Ramsey Canyon leopard frog, Lithobates subaquavocalis ,
Green frog, Lithobates clamitans or Rana clamitans 
Vegas Valley leopard frog, Lithobates fisheri 
Pig frog, Lithobates grylio 
River frog, Lithobates heckscheri 
Florida bog frog, Lithobates okaloosae or Rana okaloosae 
Relict leopard frog, Lithobates onca or Rana onca 
Pickerel frog, Lithobates palustris 
Northern leopard frog, Lithobates pipiens or Rana pipiens  and:
Mid-Atlantic coast leopard frog, Lithobates kauffeldi
Mink frog, Lithobates septentrionalis 
Southern leopard frog, Lithobates sphenocephalus 
Wood frog, Lithobates sylvaticus 
Tarahumara frog, Lithobates tarahumarae or Rana tarahumarae 
Carpenter frog, Lithobates virgatipes 
Lowland leopard frog, Lithobates yavapaiensis 
Japanese wrinkled frog, Glandirana rugosa *  (Hawaii only)

Family: Craugastoridae
Barking frog, Craugastor augusti

Family: Eleutherodactylidae

Subfamily: Eleutherodactylinae
Coquí, Eleutherodactylus coqui *  (Puerto Rico only)
Rio Grande chirping frog, Eleutherodactylus cystignathoides , only:
Rio Grande chirping frog, Eleutherodactylus (cystignathoides) campi
Spotted chirping frog, Eleutherodactylus guttilatus 

Antilles coqui, Eleutherodactylus johnstonei   (Bermuda, introduced), and:
Montserrat whistling frog, Eleutherodactylus montserratae (Bermuda)

Cliff chirping frog, Eleutherodactylus marnockii 
Greenhouse frog, Eleutherodactylus planirostris *

Family: Leptodactylidae

Subfamily: Leptodactylinae
Mexican white-lipped frog, Leptodactylus fragilis

Family: Microhylidae

Subfamily: Gastrophryninae
Sheep frog, Hypopachus variolosus

Subfamily: Microhylinae
North American narrow-mouthed frogs
Eastern narrow-mouthed toad, Gastrophryne carolinensis 
Western narrow-mouthed toad, Gastrophryne olivacea  and:
Sinaloan narrow-mouthed toad, Gastrophryne mazatlanensis

Family: Dendrobatidae

Subfamily: Dendrobatinae
Green-and-black poison dart frog, Dendrobates auratus *  (Hawaii only)

See also

 List of reptiles of North America north of Mexico
 List of U.S. state reptiles
 List of U.S. state amphibians
 List of threatened reptiles and amphibians of the United States
 List of U.S. state birds
 List of birds of North America
 List of U.S. state mammals
 List of mammals of North America
 Lists of reptiles by region
 Lists of amphibians by region

Notes

References

Further reading

External links
8th Edition of Scientific and Standard English Names of Amphibians and Reptiles of North America North of Mexico published by the Society for the Study of Amphibians and Reptiles (SSAR), available on the website of the American Society of Ichthyologists and Herpetologists

 
 AmphibiaWeb Database. University of California, Berkeley, CA, USA.
 Checklist of Amphibian Species and an Online Identification Guide for the Identification of Amphibians in North America north of Mexico
 Scientific and Common Names of the Reptiles and Amphibians of North America – Explained
 The IUCN Red List of Threatened Species
 Endangered Species Program – US Fish & Wildlife Service
 Species Search – US Fish & Wildlife Service
 Endangered Species Act – National Marine Fisheries Service – NOAA

 
 

.
.
North America
Amphibians